Niantic is a village in Macon County, Illinois, United States. Its population was 612 at the 2020 census, down from 707 in 2010. It is included in the Decatur, Illinois Metropolitan Statistical Area.

History

Niantic was among the earliest settled townships in the county. In 1825, Joseph Strickling, a native of Ohio, first settled in what is now Niantic Township. He erected the first log cabin in Niantic.

From 1825 to 1840, there were very few permanent settlers. The township's population varied on settlers setting up temporary homes on their way to the American West. The first schoolhouse was a log cabin built in 1847.

The Potawatomi Death Trail ran through Niantic in 1838.

Geography

The village drains westward to southwest-flowing tributaries of the Sangamon River.

Demographics

As of the census of 2000, there were 738 people, 269 households, and 200 families residing in the village. The racial makeup of the village was 99.59% White, 0.14% Native American, and 0.27% from two or more races. Hispanic or Latino people of any race were 0.68% of the population.

There were 269 households, out of which 37.9% had children under the age of 18 living with them, 62.8% were married couples living together, 7.4% had a female householder with no husband present, and 25.3% were non-families. 21.6% of all households were made up of individuals, and 9.7% had someone living alone who was 65 years of age or older. The average household size was 2.74 and the average family size was 3.18.

In the village, the population was spread out, with 31.2% under the age of 18, 7.3% from 18 to 24, 28.7% from 25 to 44, 19.5% from 45 to 64, and 13.3% who were 65 years of age or older. The median age was 33 years. For every 100 females, there were 99.5 males. For every 100 females age 18 and over, there were 94.6 males.

The median income for a household in the village was $41,184, and the median income for a family was $42,500. Males had a median income of $33,750 versus $21,500 for females. The per capita income for the village was $19,448. About 5.7% of families and 7.8% of the population were below the poverty line, including 9.4% of those under age 18 and 9.2% of those age 65 or over.

Education
Niantic is home to Sangamon Valley High School, which is part of Sangamon Valley C.U.S.D. #9.

Notable people

 Art Phelan, third baseman for the Chicago Cubs and Cincinnati Reds; born in Niantic
 John L. Rotz, a jockey in National Museum of Racing and Hall of Fame; born in Niantic

Gallery

References

Villages in Macon County, Illinois
Villages in Illinois